Narumiya International (jp: 株式会社ナルミヤ・インターナショナル) is a Japanese company limited headquartered in Minato Ward, Tokyo, Japan. The firm manufactures and distributes textiles and specializes in children's clothing.

Overview 

As of 2005, the company operated 896 stores globally. The company focuses on the manufacture, processing and sale of childrenʼs clothing and accessories for existing brands under license and for the company's own set of in house brands. In 2007, SBI Holdings took a majority stake in the company. In August 2016, it was announced that Japan Industrial Partners was to acquire Nuramiya for an undisclosed amount.

History 

 In 1906, the company was established as a dry goods wholesaler in Hiroshima, Japan.
 In 1952, the company was registered as the Narumiya Textile Corporation.
 In 1968, the company began making women's apparel.
 In 1979, the company changed its name to the Narumiya Corporation and moved its head office to Minato Ward, Tokyo from Hiroshima.
 In August 1991, the name was changed again to Narumiya Enterprise Company Limited with the establishment of two wholly owned subsidiaries, Narumiya International Corporation and Narumiya Company Limited.
 In 1995, the company name was again changed to Narumiya International Company Limited and a store was opened in Hong Kong.
 On March 9, 2009, the company was listed on the JASDAQ

Brands 

 Angel Blue
 Anna Sui Mini
 Blue Cross -964-
 Blue Cross Girls
 Blue Cross Kids
 Daisy Lovers
 Daisy Lovers Paradise Kids
 Kate Spade New York Children's
 Lindsay
 Jusqu'a
 Mezzo Piano
 Mini-K
 Pink Papillon
 Pom Ponette
 Pom Ponette Junior

References

External links 
 Narumiya International Website

Companies established in 1995
Textile companies of Japan